Blood in the Bullring (Spanish:Sangre en el ruedo) is a 1969 Spanish drama film directed by Rafael Gil and starring Alberto Closas, Ángel Teruel and Francisco Rabal.

synopsis
The son of a famous bullfighter tries to solve an injustice that his father did, even if he must to become bullfighter too. Spanish melodrama with odd family relationships.

Cast
 Alberto Closas as José Domínguez  
 Ángel Teruel as Juanito Carmona 'Manuel Montes'  
 Francisco Rabal as Juan Carmona  
 Cristina Galbó as Paloma Domínguez  
 José Sazatornil as Apoderado  
 José Sacristán as Andrés Medina  
 Guillermo Marín as Director del periódico  
 Mary Begoña as Ramona  
 Arturo López 
 Manuel Velasco 
 Joaquín Pamplona as Cayetano  
 Alfonso del Real as Alcalde  
 Erasmo Pascual as Sacerdote en el tendido  
 Goyo Lebrero as Taquillero del ferrocaril  
 Rafael Hernández as Mecánico  
 Fernando Sánchez Polack as Félix  
 José Morales 
 José Guijarro 
 Luis Barbero as Jorge  
 María José García de Lorente 
 Fabián Conde as Nicasio  
 Carlos Hernán 
 Maria Gustafsson
 Javier Lozano 
 Alberto Fernández as Camionero  
 Luís Pacheco 
 José Mata
 Ramón Fernández Tejela
 José Bódalo as Rafael

References

Bibliography 
 Bentley, Bernard. A Companion to Spanish Cinema. Boydell & Brewer 2008.

External links 
 

1960 drama films
1960 films
Spanish drama films
1969 films
1960s Spanish-language films
Films directed by Rafael Gil
1969 drama films
1960s Spanish films